Bielany-Tyniec Landscape Park (Bielańsko-Tyniecki Park Krajobrazowy) is a protected area (Landscape Park) in southern Poland, established in 1981, covering an area of .

Location
The Park is in Lesser Poland Voivodeship. Part of it is within the city of Kraków, with the remainder in Kraków County, shared between two gminas (administrative districts): Gmina Czernichów and Gmina Liszki. The Park takes its name from Bielany and Tyniec, two former villages which are now part of Kraków.

Within the Landscape Park are four nature reserves, as well as 18 natural monuments, including trees and caves.

References

External links

Landscape parks in Poland
Protected areas established in 1981
Parks in Lesser Poland Voivodeship